Codi Yusuf (born 10 April 1998) is a South African cricketer. He made his Twenty20 debut for Mpumalanga in the 2018 Africa T20 Cup on 14 September 2018. In September 2019, he was named in Gauteng's squad for the 2019–20 CSA Provincial T20 Cup.

He made his List A debut on 6 October 2019, for Gauteng in the 2019–20 CSA Provincial One-Day Challenge. He made his first-class debut on 17 October 2019, for Gauteng in the 2019–20 CSA 3-Day Provincial Cup. He was the joint-leading wicket-taker in the 2019–20 CSA Provincial One-Day Challenge, with sixteen dismissals in nine matches.

In April 2021, he was named in Gauteng's squad, ahead of the 2021–22 cricket season in South Africa.

References

External links
 

1998 births
Living people
South African cricketers
Gauteng cricketers
Mpumalanga cricketers
Place of birth missing (living people)